Ioannis Psathas (alternate spellings: Giannis, Yiannis) (born April 15, 1983) is a Greek professional basketball player. He is 1.98 m (6 ft 6 in) in height, and he can play at both the  small forward and power forward positions.

Professional career
Psathas started his amateur career with Aetos Polygyrou and AO Polygyrou, where he stayed from 1997 to 2002. Then, he played for Aetos Toumpas, and one year later, he signed with Achileas Triandias.

In 2004, he joined ICBS of the Greek A2 League, where he stayed for three seasons.

From 2007 through 2012, Psathas played with multiple teams, such as Chalkida, Rethymno, Apollon Patras, and Psychiko.

In 2012, he moved to Nea Kifissia. With Kifissia, he gained the league promotion to the top-tier level Greek Basket League, in 2013. He stayed with the club until 2015.

On June 10, 2015, Psathas joined Kymis, after signing a two-year contract with them. During his first season with Kymis (2015–16), he won the Greek 2nd Division. In 2016, he joined Doxa Lefkadas.

References

External links
Ioannis Psathas at eurobasket.com
Ioannis Psathas at realgm.com
Ioannis Psathas at draftexpress.com
Ioannis Psathas at fiba.com (game center)
Ioannis Psathas at baskethotel.com
Ioannis Psathas at esake.gr 

1983 births
Living people
AGEH Gymnastikos B.C. players
Apollon Patras B.C. players
Doxa Lefkadas B.C. players
Greek men's basketball players
Greek Basket League players
ICBS B.C. players
Kymis B.C. players
Nea Kifissia B.C. players
Power forwards (basketball)
Psychiko B.C. players
Rethymno B.C. players
Small forwards
People from Chalkidiki
Sportspeople from Central Macedonia